Sybrinus albosignatus is a species of beetle in the family Cerambycidae. It was described by Stephan von Breuning in 1948.

Subspecies
 Sybrinus albosignatus albosignatus Breuning, 1948
 Sybrinus albosignatus sokotrensis Téocchi, Jiroux & Sudre, 2004

References

Desmiphorini
Beetles described in 1948